The  was a period of political instability in the Dutch Republic between approximately 1780 and 1787. Its name derives from the Patriots faction who opposed the rule of the stadtholder, William V, Prince of Orange, and his supporters who were known as Orangists.

In 1781 one of the leaders of the Patriots, Joan Derk van der Capellen tot den Pol anonymously published a pamphlet, entitled  ("To the People of the Netherlands"), in which he advocated the formation of civic militias on the Swiss and American model to help restore the republican constitution. Such militias were subsequently organised in many localities and formed, together with Patriot political clubs, the core of the Patriot movement. This enabled them to replace the representatives of these cities in the States of several provinces, gaining Patriot majorities in the States of Holland, Groningen and Utrecht, and frequently also in the States General. This helped to emasculate the stadtholder's power as he was deprived of his command over a large part of the Dutch States Army. A low-key civil war ensued that resulted in a military stalemate, until in September–October 1787 the Patriots were defeated by a Prussian army and many were forced into exile.

Background

Etymology 
The term Patriot (from Greek , "fellow countryman") had previously been used in the 17th century by anti-Orangists, but when French troops invaded the Republic in 1747, "Patriots" demanded the return of the Orange stadtholderate, which ended the Second Stadtholderless Period (1702–1747). From 1756 onward, however, Dutch States Party  once again began styling themselves "Patriots". Patriotism and anti-Orangism had become synonymous.

The Patriots can be divided into two separate groups: aristocrats and democrats. The aristocratic Patriots (also called  or "Old Patriots"), initially the strongest, can be viewed as oppositional , who either sought to enter the factions in power, or tried to realise the so-called "Loevesteinian" ideal of a republic without Orange; they came from the existing Dutch States Party. The democratic Patriots emerged later, and consisted mainly of non-regent members of the bourgeoisie, who strove to democratise the Republic.

Finally, the term  for the historical era is a historiographical invention of 19th-century Dutch historians, comparable to the terms "First Stadtholderless Period", "Second Stadtholderless Period", and "Fransche Tijd (French Era)" (for the era of the Batavian Republic, the Kingdom of Holland and the French First Empire, 1795–1813). Herman Theodoor Colenbrander for instance, used the term as the title of one of his main works:  (The Hague, 1897). The term was often used in a pejorative fashion, but lately has acquired a more positive connotation.<ref>Cf. W. van der Zwaag, Patriottenbeweging en geschiedschrijving Bezinning-Achtergrond (1990) in Digibron</ref>

Perceived decline of the Dutch Republic

After the halcyon days of the Dutch Golden Age of the first two-thirds of the 17th century, the Dutch economy entered a period of stagnation and relative decline. The absolute size of Dutch GNP remained constant, but the economy was overtaken by that of other European countries in the course of the 18th century. Besides, in a number of economic sectors, such as the fisheries and most industries that had sprung up in the early 17th century, an absolute decline occurred. The country's deindustrialization resulted in de-urbanization as artisans that had worked in the disappearing industries had to move to areas where work was still to be found. The shrinking industrial base was also concentrating in particular areas, to the detriment of other areas where certain industries (shipbuilding, textiles) had formerly been prominent. Remarkably for an era of rapid population growth in other European countries, the size of the Dutch population remained constant during the 18th century at around 1.9 million people, which (in view of the constant absolute size of the economy) resulted in a constant per capita income. But this was somewhat misleading as economic inequality markedly increased during the 18th century: the economy became dominated by a small group of very rich rentiers, and the economy shifted to what we would now call a service economy, in which the commercial sector (always strong in the Netherlands) and the banking sector dominated. These shifts had a devastating effect for the people who experienced downward social mobility and ended up in the lower strata of Dutch society. But even those that were not affected by such downward mobility, and remained in the upper and middle classes, were affected by this perceived economic decline.

The economic decline worked through in the political sphere as after the Peace of Utrecht of 1713 the government of the Dutch Republic felt constrained to enter upon a policy of austerity as a consequence of the dire state of the Dutch public finances. Both the mercenary Dutch States Army and the Dutch navy suffered a large shrinkage in the following period, and consequently the Republic had to give up the pretense of being a European great power, in the military sense, with the diplomatic consequences that entailed. It became clear that the Republic had become a pawn in European power politics, depending on the good will of other countries such as France, Prussia and Great Britain. This decline in international diplomatic standing also contributed to the malaise that resulted from the perceived decline.

Growing disaffection with the political system

The disaffection with the perceived state of the economy and diplomatic decline was paired with a growing disaffection with the political system of the Dutch Republic among middle-class Dutchmen. The Dutch "constitution" defined the Dutch Republic as a confederation of sovereign provinces with a republican character. Formally, power was supposed to flow upward, from the local governments (governments of select cities that possessed City Rights, and the aristocracy in rural areas) toward the provincial States, and eventually the States-General. Those local governments, however, though ostensibly representing "The People" according to the prevailing ideology, had in fact evolved into oligarchies dominated by a few families that in the cities at least were not formally part of the nobility, but were considered "patrician" in the classical sense. The members of the  class co-opted each other in the city , which elected the city magistrates and sent delegates to the regional and national States.

The concentration of power in a more and more closed oligarchy frustrated the middle class, that saw its opportunities for political and social advancement blocked, also because the political patronage in regard to all kinds of petty offices was concentrated in the hands of the oligarchs, who favored their own political allies. Though offices were often venal and for sale, this fact was ironically less resented than the fact that those offices were not available on the same footing to everyone. Opening up the political system to the middle class had therefore been an objective of political reformers like the so-called  who in 1747 helped elevate the Frisian stadtholder William IV to stadtholder in all seven provinces, on a hereditary basis, with greatly expanded powers, in the hope that he would use those powers to promote the political influence of the would-be "democrats." That hope proved vain, also because of his untimely death in 1751, after which he was succeeded by his infant son William V, who was three years of age at the time. Power devolved upon regents, first the dowager Princess of Orange, and after her death in 1759, de facto Duke Louis Ernest of Brunswick-Lüneburg, who saw even less merit in "democratic" experiments. Duke Louis would retain a virtual guardianship in accordance with the so-called  even after the young Prince had come of age. Meanwhile, the greatly expanded powers of the stadtholder consisted primarily in his right of appointment, or at least approval, of magistrates on the local and provincial level, which were enshrined in the so-called  (Government Regulations) adopted by most provinces in 1747. These powers allowed him to overrule the elections by the local  if the results did not comport with his wishes, and so bestowed great powers of political patronage on the local level on him (and the regents who ruled in place of the under-age William V before 1766). The end result was that the "States party"  that had ruled the country during the Second Stadtholderless Period were replaced by Orangist party men, who were ideologically opposed to popular influence, closing the door to "democratic" experiments. Though the "democrats" had been in the Orangist camp in 1747, they therefore soon came into an alliance of convenience with the disenfranchised "States party" .

The American imbroglio
The American Declaration of Independence did not elicit enthusiasm from everyone in the Dutch Republic once it became known there in August 1776. But others were less scornful. Dutch merchants, especially in the Amsterdam Chamber of the moribund WIC, had long chafed against the restrictions the British Navigation Acts imposed on direct trade with the American colonies in revolt. The American Revolution opened new perspectives to unfettered trade, though for the moment primarily on the smuggling route via the WIC colony of Sint Eustatius. That entrepôt soon became an important export port for the supply of the American rebels with Dutch arms. The Amsterdam  were particularly interested in opening formal trade negotiations with the Continental Congress; secret diplomacy was soon embarked upon by the pensionaries of a number of mercantile cities, like Engelbert François van Berckel (Amsterdam) and Cornelis de Gijselaar (Dordrecht), behind the back of the stadtholder and the States-General. The French ambassador to the Republic, Vauguyon, arranged contacts with the American ambassador to the French court, Benjamin Franklin, in 1778, which in time led to the sending out of John Adams as American emissary to the Republic. In 1778, there also were secret negotiations between the Amsterdam banker Jean de Neufville and the American agent in Aachen, William Lee. The two concluded a secret agreement on a treaty of amity and commerce between the two Republics, the draft of which was discovered by the British when they intercepted ambassador-to-the-Netherlands-to-be Henry Laurens at sea. They used this as a casus belli for declaring the Fourth Anglo-Dutch War in December 1780 (together with the actions from Dutch territory by the American privateer John Paul Jones, and the planned Dutch accession to the First League of Armed Neutrality).

The war went disastrously for the Dutch, despite the fact that the Dutch fleet had been enlarged appreciably in the preceding years. but it was scarcely used by the Dutch, with the stadtholder, as Admiral-General, in supreme command. At the start of the war, a number of Dutch warships were surprised by ships of the Royal Navy, who according to the Dutch, sneaked up under a false flag, and when they had approached the unsuspecting Dutchmen (who were not yet aware of the start of the war), ran up their true colors and opened fire. The Dutch ships then struck their colors after firing a single broadside in reply "to satisfy honor." In this way individual ships, and even a complete squadron, were lost. The British blockaded the Dutch coast without much response from the Dutch fleet. There was one big battle between a Dutch squadron under rear-admiral Johan Zoutman and a British one under vice-admiral Sir Hyde Parker, which ended inconclusively, but on the whole the Dutch fleet remained in port, due to a state of "unreadiness," according to the Dutch commanders. This lack of activity caused great dissatisfaction among Dutch shippers who wanted convoy protection against the British, and also among the population at large, who felt humiliated by what many saw as "cowardice." The stadtholder was generally blamed. After a brief wave of euphoria due to Zoutman's heroics (which were duly exploited in the official propaganda), the navy again earned the disapproval of public opinion because of its inactivity. This only increased after the States-General in 1782 agreed with France on a naval alliance or concert that led to a planned joint action against Great Britain. To that end a Dutch fleet of ten ships of the line would in 1783 be sent to the French port of Brest to join the French fleet there. However, a direct order to set sail was disobeyed by the Dutch naval top with again the excuse of "unreadiness," but some officers, like vice-admiral Lodewijk van Bylandt, the intended leader of the expedition, let it be known that they did not want to cooperate with the French. This caused a scandal, known as the Brest Affair in which Pieter Paulus, the fiscal (prosecutor) of the Admiralty of Rotterdam was to lead an inquest, but this never resulted in a conviction. But the damage to the reputation of the Dutch navy and the stadtholder as its commander-in-chief in Dutch public opinion was appreciable, and this undermined the regime.

The stadtholder was not the only one reminded by the American Declaration of Independence of its Dutch equivalent of 1581. Many others saw an analogy between the American Revolution and the Dutch Revolt, and this helped engender much sympathy for the American cause in Dutch public opinion. When John Adams arrived in the Netherlands from Paris in 1780, in search of Dutch loans for the financing of the American struggle, he came armed with a long list of Dutch contacts. At first, however, it was an uphill struggle to interest the Dutch elite. Adams set to work to influence public opinion with the help of a number of those Dutch contacts which he enumerates in a letter to United States Secretary of Foreign Affairs Robert Livingstone of 4 September 1782. He mentions the Amsterdam lawyer Hendrik Calkoen, who was very interested in the American cause, and who posed thirty questions on the matter that Adams answered in a number of letters, that were later bundled and published as an influential pamphlet. Calkoen was keen to again emphasize the analogy between the Dutch and American struggles for independence. The Gazette was the first European newspaper to carry a translation of the Constitution of Massachusetts, principally authored by Adams, on 3 October 1780. In that context Adams also mentions the journalist Antoine Marie Cerisier and his periodical . Another propagandist for the American cause, who drew inferences for the Dutch political situation, was the Overijssel maverick nobleman Joan Derk van der Capellen tot den Pol, who had the Declaration of Independence, and other American constitutional documents, translated into Dutch.

By these propagandistic activities the American and Dutch causes became intertwined in the public's mind as a model of "republican fraternity". Adams himself harped on this theme in the "Memorial" he presented to the States-General to obtain acceptance of his credentials as ambassador on 19 April 1781: 
The immediate audience of the "Memorial" may have been sceptical, but elsewhere the document made a great impression.

 The Patriot Revolt 
The pamphlet "To the People of the Netherlands"

In the night of 25 on 26 September 1781, the anonymous pamphlet  ("To the People of the Netherlands") was distributed in a number of Dutch cities. It was later discovered that it had been written by Adams' friend Van der Capellen, and that its successful distribution had been organised by François Adriaan van der Kemp. Though the pamphlet was immediately proscribed as seditious by the authorities, it enjoyed a wide circulation.

"Seditious" it certainly was, as the pamphlet repeatedly exhorted the burghers of the Netherlands to arm themselves and take matters into their own hands. The author likens the country to a great company, like the VOC, in which the administrators serve the shareholders. . The author then continues with a diatribe against the stadtholder: . Therefore:

These themes: the primacy of the people, whose servants the politicians are; the need to arm the people in units who elect their own officers; to elect commissioners who investigate government wrongdoing, as a parallel source of power next to the existing institutions; the need to protect the freedom of the press; would be repeated time after time in other Patriot pamphlets and the Patriot press in later years. But these ideas were rooted in a particular perspective on Dutch history, not in abstract philosophical ideas, taken from the French Enlightenment. It was a mixture of old and new ideas,
and attitudes to the Dutch constitution. But this mixture would diverge into two distinctive strands in the course of the next few years, until it would lead to an ideological split between the "aristocratic" and "democratic" Patriots.

But these one-off publications were soon joined by an innovation in the vernacular press. But in 1781 the Patriot Pieter 't Hoen started a periodical in Dutch in Utrecht, entitled  (The Post of the Lower Rhine) that would become a combination of opinion weekly, tabloid, and scandal sheet, with a Patriot bias that attacked the stadtholder and the "aristocratic" Patriots with equal abandon. All these periodicals enjoyed great popularity in middle-class circles, probably because they mixed serious political analysis with scurrilous libels of the political elite. The journalists and publishers were often prosecuted by their enraged victims, but fines and jail-time were part of the job in these times. As they had a national readership they helped Patriot politics go beyond the local confines they would normally have encountered. And their ideological consistency helped to bring about unity in especially the "democratic" wing of the Patriot movement.

The 
Since the late Middle Ages cities in the Habsburg Netherlands had employed citizen militias for external defense (mostly against incursions from neighboring provinces), and to keep public order. These militias, called , played an important part in the early stages of the Dutch Revolt when they on their own successfully defended important cities against the Spanish troops of the Duke of Alba, which helped to give them an aura of heroism. This independence was symbolized by the fact that the  usually elected its own officers. But starting in the early 17th century the militias lost their independence and became subservient to the regular city magistracy. They also became a part of the regular defense structure of the country, next to the States Army (though not part of that mercenary military formation). By the early 1780s the militias were but a caricature of their proud predecessors, subservient to the city magistrates, who made officer commissions the preserve of the  class, and more like recreative societies than serious military formations. But as elsewhere the stadtholderian regime blocked such reform. 

In contrast with the  these competing militias were open to members of all religious denominations; they elected their own officers; and they trained regularly in military drill and the use of arms. The Patriots proposed to use the militias to promote the representation of their officers in official councils, and to defend the rights of free assembly and speech of the citizenry.
Depending on local political circumstances the Free corps sometimes remained a parallel military structure, and sometimes gradually took over the old .

Where a  remained in charge of the  he was suddenly supposed to represent his men in the  thereby cunningly reverting the old hierarchy. In cities like Leiden, Zutphen and Utrecht the Free corps drew up petitions demanding recognition of the newly-constituted militias by the city governments, which was subsequently granted. In this early phase there was a happy cooperation between the Patriots and the anti-Orangist , because of their common interest in diminishing the powers of the stadtholder. In Holland province his advantage of exercising command of the Hague garrison of the States Army was offset by the power of the Free Corps in most cities, and the latter had the additional advantage of providing a defense against the usual Orangist weapon of threatened mob violence, because the middle-class Patriots feared the city paupers as much as the  did, and formed a common front against the poor. And not without reason, because in several cities, there were Orangist-inspired riots by members of the working class, like the riots in Rotterdam in 1783 and the Hague in 1784, led by the fish-monger Kaat Mussel. On 3 April 1784 such a riot was bloodily suppressed by a Free-Corps company in Rotterdam, when a panicky officer ordered his men to open fire on the mob, which resulted in several people killed. Initially, the officer was blamed, but (due to the fact that more and more riots occurred) the States of Holland later exonerated the Free Corps and blamed the Orangist rioters.

The Free Corps were a local phenomenon, limited to the areas where the Patriot movement was strong, partly because the Patriot ideology for a very long time respected the confederal structure of the Dutch Republic. They remained "federal" democrats. But from the end of 1784 they started to organize on a national level. In December the first congress of representatives of a federation of Free Corps assembled in Utrecht. This was soon followed by the second congress on 25 February 1785, which commissioned the Leiden Free Corps to draft a manifesto. This manifesto was adopted during the third congress, again in Utrecht on 14 June 1785. It took the form of a solemn  (Act of Association for the defense of the Republican constitution, or "Act of Association" for short) in which the members of the Free Corps pledged to support each other against attempts at suppression by the civil authorities and against attacks by Orangist mobs. Also the Act for the first time established  (People's government by representation) as the ultimate goal of the Free Corps movement.The text of the Act is reproduced by Colenbrander in vol. II of Patriottentijd, Appendix 2 to chapter IV, pp. 366-367 But this was only the first such manifesto.

The  (Leiden Draft), another important Patriot manifesto, was drawn up after the Leiden  was prohibited from performing its drill maneuvers on 23 July 1785 by the city government. In response a congress of the representatives of the Holland  commissioned a group of members, among whom Wybo Fijnje, Pieter Vreede, and Rutger Jan Schimmelpenninck to write the manifesto along the lines of the draft they discussed in a meeting on 4 October 1785. This resulted in the publication of the manifesto, entitled  (Design to make the Republic inwardly contented and outwardly feared by a salutary union of interests of Regent and Citizen, etc.) in which among other things the abolition of the right of approval of city-government appointments of the stadtholder was proposed, to be replaced by democratic elections.

Overturning the old order in Utrecht and Amsterdam
Implementing the Patriot manifestos brought a fundamental rift between the "democratic" and "aristocratic" wings of the Patriot movement to light. Initially both saw a common interest and a basis for cooperation (as the Leiden Draft explicitly proposes). This was exemplified by the Utrecht example where in July 1783 the  acceded to the demand of the local Free Corps to be recognized as the new manifestation of the  under the direction of an elected Burgher Defense Council. Both factions were opposed to the 1674 Government Regulation that gave extensive powers to the stadtholder to appoint city magistrates. This was a standing invitation to abuse. Nicolaas de Pesters,  of Utrecht, was infamous for his abuse of political patronage. Attempts to come to an understanding with the stadtholder in the Fall of 1783 failed, because the latter insisted on his "due rights." Then in January 1784 an occasion presented itself to test the stadtholder's resolve, when a vacancy in the  occurred.

But the honeymoon between the "democrats" and "aristocrats" did not last. On 23 April 1784 a draft of a new "constitution" for Utrecht province, to replace the 1674 Regulation, was published in the Utrecht Patriot newspaper , after the Utrecht States had imprudently invited all citizens to lodge their objections to the Regulations in early 1784. This draft of 117 articles proposed that henceforth the Utrecht city  was to be popularly elected under a form of census suffrage in indirect elections. Another objectionable proposal was the institution of an elected body of 16 burgher representatives to sit in permanent session to hear and address grievances of citizens against the city government. The  were not about to let go of their powers without a fight, but instead of getting into a direct confrontation with the democrats they at first tried to drown the proposal in red tape. The States drafted a far more conservative counter-proposal and tried to push this through by subterfuge. This elicited a strong response of the Utrecht  in the form of a petition opposing that counter-draft.

The negotiations fruitlessly dragged on and in January 1785 six companies of the   approached the Constituted to urge them to take more drastic steps. The irate "shooters" elected a new group of representatives, called the "Commissioned," to permanently ensure the zeal of the Constituted. The  then went out of its way to appoint someone the petitioners had already declared "unacceptable", one Jonathan Sichterman.

The train of events that then was set in motion could be considered a "paradigm" for revolutionary "journées" that would be followed in similar circumstances in Utrecht itself, and in other Dutch cities in the following two years. First the city government would commit some kind of "provocation" that would enrage the Free Corps members and other Patriots. The democrats would work themselves into a lather, whipped up by seditious pamphlets and speeches. Then they would march to the town hall and assemble, with their weapons, in the town square, which they would easily fill with their large numbers. The city fathers would be summoned to come to the town hall and would be more or less locked up in their meeting room. They would not be physically assaulted (even provided with food and drink), but the psychological pressure of the threatening crowd, and the threats that "it would be impossible to constrain them, if the demands were not met" would soon convince them to give in. But once everybody had returned home in triumph, the city fathers would regain their courage, and renege on their promises "as these had been forced under duress." And a new cycle would soon commence.

Something like this happened on 11–12 March 1785 in Utrecht, when agitators like Ondaatje whipped the crowd into a frenzy; the Utrecht city hall was surrounded by 2,000 angry Free Corps men and the Utrecht  reluctantly agreed to withdraw Sicherman's appointment after Ondaatje made clear that the Constituted would not be fobbed off. "We are not '48-ers," he declared, "but 85-ers, who understand our rights and liberties well enough, ... we are not canaille" referring to a similar event during the revolution of 1748, when the  had indeed been fobbed off by the then-stadtholder. But the reaction was swift: 17 members of the  resigned in protest, and soon a petition of notable citizens was sent to the States with a request to intervene. The States excoriated Ondaatje and his mob and manage to intimidate Ondaatje sufficiently to elicit a humble apology. On 23 March the 19  members reoccupied their seats, and opened criminal proceedings against Ondaatje and other instigators of the events of 11 March. Sicherman could have his appointment back, but he declined; the council therefore left the vacancy unfilled.

But the democrats were back in August and again in September with demonstrations following the established paradigm. On 20 December they promised to adopt a democratic city constitution within three months. And indeed, on 20 March 1786, while the Free Corps again occupied the central square in silent menace, while a blizzard blew, the  allowed several of its members to formally abjure the old Government Regulation. On 2 August 1786 an elected Burgher College was installed as the new city council.

In the Spring of 1787 similar events took place in Amsterdam. The political situation in that city had long been very different than in Utrecht. The Amsterdam  belonged to the old States-Party faction and were as such opposed to the stadtholder long before the Patriot movement started to rear its head. Its pensionary, Engelbert François van Berckel, together with the pensionaries of Dordrecht (Cornelis de Gijselaar) and of Haarlem (Adriaan van Zeebergh) formed an anti-stadtholderian triumvirate in the States of Holland during the days of the war with Great Britain. But this was all based on the interests of Amsterdam as a mercantile city. The Amsterdam  were in no mood for "democratic" experiments that would undermine their privileges. The more the democrats gained influence in other cities, the more the Amsterdam  drew closer to their Orangist enemies, and the stadtholder's regime. Van Berckel lost the initiative to Orangist  like Joachim Rendorp, and Willem Gerrit Dedel Salomonsz, who formed an Orangist minority within the Amsterdam . Amsterdam had a large Free Corps, consisting of 55 companies, but the old , under Orangist command, was still a rival armed force. Besides, the Patriots did not have a monopoly on mob violence, as the workers in the Amsterdam shipbuilding industry, the so-called  ("Ax-men"), were a strongly pro-Orange political force in the city. Patriot political clubs were rivaled by Orangist political clubs. In sum, the political forces were more evenly balanced than in other cities. And this paralyzed the Amsterdam  in the Spring of 1787. Things came to a head in February 1787 when a group of Free-Corps officers, led by a Colonel Isaac van Goudoever forced entry to the council chamber in protest against an anti-Patriot move Dedel had engineered. Only the intervention of Hendrik Daniëlsz Hooft, a venerable  prevented a fracas. On 3 April Goudoever returned at the head of 102 officers to demand that henceforth Amsterdam would only be represented by its pensionaries Van Berckel and Visscher (who were both trusted by the Patriots) in the States of Holland. This conspiracy failed due to the obduracy of the stadtholder, but on 20 April 1787 an incendiary pamphlet, entitled  ("The Treason Discovered"), made it public, and this incensed the Patriots. That night the city was abuzz with fervid Patriot activity. The Burgher Defense Council, which commanded the Free Corps, organised a petition (the "Act of Qualification") which was signed by 16,000 people, and the next day the Dam Square before the city hall was thronged with thousands of guild members, Patriot citizens and armed militiamen. Amsterdam had belatedly joined the Patriot coalition. William May had to flee across the IJ. 

Delft's "liberation" gave the Patriots command of the largest arsenal in Holland province in the Summer of 1787.

A creeping civil war
Many historians would deny that the political upheavals in the Dutch Republic during the years 1785, 1786 and 1787 amounted to a civil war. It is true that compared to the French revolution the Patriot revolution was singularly bloodless and that widespread military maneuvering remained the exception. But there actually were military actions by regular forces on both sides, aimed at deciding the issue by military means, and blood was spilled in battle. To understand how this came about, it is important first to understand the way the forces on both sides were distributed in the seven provinces and the Generality Lands. Holland paid for more than half of the troops, and it was known which regiments belonged to its , though this had no consequences for the operational command, as the army was an institution of the Republic as a whole. The troops were in peacetime usually divided over a number of garrisons in different parts of the country. These garrisons played an important role in local politics, as the officers were Orangists to a man, and the troops in the whole felt a strong allegiance to the stadtholder. The garrison cities, like Nijmegen in Gelderland, The Hague in Holland, and 'Hertogenbosch in "States Brabant" were strongpoints of Orangist influence, even though the surrounding provinces might tend to favor the Patriots. So even without explicitly threatening military violence, the army played an important role in local politics.

Before 1784 the States army was the only official standing army in the Republic, but during the so-called Kettle War, a minor military conflict with the Austrian emperor and sovereign of the Austrian Netherlands, Joseph II, the States of Holland lost confidence in the States army under the wavering command of the stadtholder, and decided to raise a separate military formation of brigade strength, outside the States army, under the command of the Rhinegrave of Salm, an officer in the States army, for its own account. This so-called "Legion of Salm" was not subject to the stadtholder as Captain-General of the States army. After the crisis passed, the States of Holland decided to abolish it, as an austerity measure, but several Holland cities, Amsterdam among them, decided to take over the financing for their own account, so that from 1785 on the Legion continued in being as a military unit that was not part of the official military command structure, and also not part of the Free Corps federation, because the members of the Legion were mercenaries, just like the soldiers of the army. The Legion did not play a role, until the Rhinegrave in September 1786 became commander-in-chief of all forces of the province of Holland, including the States army troops under the Holland , and later also the Free Corps in the provinces of Holland and Utrecht.

The events that gave rise to this development were the following. In September 1785, after a number of riots between Patriots and Orangists in The Hague during the Summer of that year, the States of Holland (by then with a slender majority of cities tending toward the Patriot side) decided to deprive the stadtholder of his command of the strong Hague garrison of the States army (though this was only formalized in July 1786). On 15 September 1785 he therefore decided to leave the city and to repair to the Het Loo Palace in Gelderland with his family. Around the same time things had come to a head in Utrecht city and part of the States of Utrecht decided to move to the city of Amersfoort, causing a schism in the States, as the representatives of the city of Utrecht and several other cities remained in Utrecht city. The Amersfoort States subsequently asked the stadtholder to put a garrison of States army troops in Amersfoort and Zeist, which was done in September 1785 with a cavalry division from the Nijmegen garrison.

The pro-Orangist States of Gelderland then asked the stadtholder to lend a hand in suppressing this "insurrection" and on 4 September a task-force of the Nijmegen garrison duly marched to Hattem and entered that city over light opposition the next day. The troops were allowed to loot the two small cities and desecrate the local churches. Stadtholder William V is said to have exclaimed on the news of the success of the operation: "Have they be hanged? Hell and Damnation. Why not hang the Satan's children?".

The "Hattem and Elburg events" electrified the Patriot opposition. Pensionary de Gijselaar (calling the stadtholder "a new Alva") demanded in the States of Holland that the stadtholder would be deprived of his command as Captain-General of the States army (which only the States General could do), and in any case take the troops on the Holland  out of the States army. When this was done this deprived the stadtholder of more than  half of his troops, effectively denying him the military means to decide the political conflict. Holland also made a pact with the Utrecht States and the  cities (the  States were hopelessly divided) to form a so-called "Cordon" to defend these provinces against military depredations of the rump-States army. The overall command of this Cordon was given to a military commission, headquartered in Woerden, while the Holland troops were put under the command of the Rhinegrave of Salm. Another important political development was that the Amsterdam  (still not purged of the Orangist minority) formally adhered to the Act of Association that the Free Corps had promulgated in the Summer of 1785.

In Utrecht city the Patriots feared an attack from the Amersfoort and Zeist troops, and started to fortify the city against a siege. The defenders received reinforcements from Holland and other Patriot strongholds, so that by the Spring of 1787 they numbered 6,000. When the Utrecht Defense Council learned that the States army had sent a task-force to occupy the hamlet of Vreeswijk near a strategically important sluice (useful to defensively inundate the surrounding countryside) they decided to force a confrontation. On 9 May 1787 the Patriot force under the command of the Utrecht  member Jean Antoine d'Averhoult attacked the States-army force in the Battle of Jutphaas, and despite several people killed, routed the mercenaries. Though this was only a skirmish, the Patriot propaganda made hay of the victory and the officer killed received a state funeral.

Foreign interference
The Patriot Revolt did not take place in a diplomatic vacuum. The Dutch Republic had from its inception been a battlefield of Great Power diplomacy in which the Holland  (lately in the guise of the States Party) had been sympathetic to France, and the Orangists usually favored England and later Great Britain. Since the days of the 1688 invasion of England followed by the 1689 naval treaty with England, the Dutch had been in nominal alliance with the British, and the diplomatic relations with France had been cool since the end of the War of the Spanish Succession and the latest French invasion in 1747, but they had markedly improved during the era of the American Revolutionary War, when the Dutch at first profited from their "neutral-flag" trade of contraband goods with the French and Americans, and later were the victims of British aggression in the Fourth Anglo-Dutch War, that had so recently ended. Franco-Dutch relations became even better when France offered its good offices, both to obtain the 1784 treaty of Paris with Great Britain that ended the war, and subsequently to obtain peace with emperor Joseph II, that ended the "Kettle War" with the Treaty of Fontainebleau. Shortly after that, special envoy Gerard Brantsen, a moderate Patriot, crowned this with the treaty of amity and commerce with France of October 1785.

One person who observed this thaw in Franco-Dutch diplomatic relations with great alarm was the new British ambassador to The Hague, accredited since 1784, Sir James Harris. Harris had a tendency to see French conspiracies everywhere, and in the Dutch case he may have been right. Because the French saw the discomfiture of the Dutch stadtholder with great pleasure, although their enthusiasm was limited to the advance of their old friends, the Amsterdam States Party ; they were far less enthusiastic about the democratic designs of the other wing of the Patriot party. With the support of the Cabinet of William Pitt the Younger Harris set about to reclaim the Republic for British influence, and he did not always limit himself to diplomatic means. One important task was to shore up the morale of the dispirited stadtholder after his departure from The Hague in September 1785. William at that time had two options: either to give in to the Patriot demands and accept some kind of compromise as to the Government Regulations, or to hold on to his "due rights" at any cost. The latter was his favorite option (he was wont to quote the maxim ) and Harris, in concert with William's wife Wilhelmina of Prussia, encouraged him to take this option. But Harris did far more: he was supplied with ample funds from the British Secret Service fund and he used that money to buy influence left and right, beginning with a generous pension-with-strings-attached of £4,000 per annum for the stadtholder himself. Ably assisted by "confidential agents", of which baron Hendrik August van Kinckel is the best known, he used these funds to subsidize the establishment of Orangist Free Corps in provinces like Zeeland and Friesland where the Orangists were in the majority, which were used to intimidate the Patriot minorities in these provinces. He tried to lure the conservative  in Amsterdam away from their anti-Orangist stance with promises of trade concessions by Britain, and promises of concessions from the stadtholder that would safeguard their own privileges, but avoid any "democratic" experiments.

But Harris' most important ploy was an attempt to engineer an alliance with Prussia that would thwart the "French designs". This would kill two birds with one stone: it would keep the stadtholder in power, and it would renew the Anglo-Prussian alliance that had briefly existed during the Seven Years' War. To that end he visited the aging king Frederick the Great of Prussia, Wilhelmina's uncle, in August 1785 in Berlin. But Frederick was loath to endanger good relations with  France, and refused to take the bait. "The pear is not ripe," the old king remarked cryptically.

Instead Prussia in concert with France attempted to mediate between the warring parties in the Republic. To that end both countries sent mediators, the ambassadors Vérac and Thulemeyer, who repeatedly attempted to bring the moderates to compromise. For instance, in 1785 they proposed that the stadtholder would cede his military powers to a council, with the Princess, the pensionaries, and the leaders of both the Orangist and "aristocratic" Patriot factions as members (only the democrats would be excluded). But William refused to budge on his "due rights" and without that the Patriots would not budge either.

In 1786 a Prussian minister, Johann von Goertz, came to The Hague with a proposal that might even be acceptable to the democrats, but Harris easily convinced William, already in great spirits after the events of Hattem and Elburg, that this would amount to a "capitulation" and the stadtholder appended conditions that were unacceptable to the Patriots. In other words, Harris was a constant obstacle to any attempts at a peaceful solution.

In any case, Frederick the Great died in August 1786, and was succeeded by his nephew (Wilhelmina's elder brother) Frederick William II of Prussia. Though the new king was not keen to go to war with France, he was less determined to avoid such a development than the old king, and from then on Harris' designs to let the Prussians do the fighting on behalf of Great Britain stood a better chance. And the French game of egging on the Patriots on the one hand, and keeping them in check on the other, became more risky. The French opposite number of von Goertz, the marquis de Rayneval, understood this, and also that a victory of the democrats in the Republic would be against French interests; France became less and less enthusiastic about favoring the Patriots.

Harris meanwhile went on with his policy of confrontation, that stood a better chance of success as also the French foreign minister Vergennes died in February 1787. With both Frederick the Great and Vergennes out of the way it was far more likely that France would allow a Prussian military intervention without a major European conflagration. Between  13 and 18 May 1787 (so shortly after the Battle of Jutphaas) a conference of Orangist notables was held in Nijmegen to decide on a strategy of confrontation. Harris stood ready with a subsidy of £70,000, ostensibly as a loan to the Orangist States of Gelderland), but in reality as a slush fund to finance Orangist Free Corps, to be used in street rioting, and to buy the favors of the vacillating  cities to leave the Patriot camp. A kind of de facto "declaration of war" (the ) was reluctantly signed by the stadtholder on 26 May 1787.

Then, completely unexpected, an event happened that played into Harris' hands. Harris had convinced Princess Wilhelmina that the Orangist forces in The Hague had become strong enough that it might be possible to wrest that city from the hands of the Patriots. Audacious where her husband was irresolute, she decided to make an appearance in The Hague to bring matters to a boil. To that end she planned a trip with a small entourage, but without an armed escort, from Nijmegen to The Hague by way of a route close to the Patriot stronghold of Gouda on 28 June 1787. Fresh horses had been ordered for her carriages at several stops underway, thereby advertising her planned route. To make certain that the Patriots would be aware of what was afoot, several Orangist agents "let slip" to everyone that would be interested, that the Princess was about to pass by. It was therefore no surprise that she was intercepted by a patrol of the Gouda Free Corps near the Goejanverwellesluis in the hamlet of Bonrepas. The Princess was not harmed and she was soon allowed to return to Nijmegen, but the fact that her captors had been impolite (one of them sat unbidden at her dinner table, which was a serious breach of etiquette; another stood with a drawn sabre in her presence) caused great consternation and outrage. The States of Holland were less than impressed and urged that the ultimatum would be huffily ignored.

Now the French played a dangerous game. Vergennes' successor Montmorin gave the impression that France would support the Patriots in case of Prussian military intervention and that to this end a military camp was being prepared in Givet, on an invasion route through the independent Prince-Bishopric of Liège, obviating the necessity of entering the Austrian Netherlands. This turned out to be a bluff, and once this became clear to the Prussians and Harris, nothing prevented an invasion of the Republic. But the Patriots, informed of the French intervention plans by yet another French envoy Jean-François de Bourgoing believed in the Givet camp till it was too late, and it steeped them in their resistance to the Prussian demands. An invasion force of around 26,000 Prussian troops under the command of  the duke of Brunswick (a nephew of William's old mentor) entered the Republic on 13 September 1787, after a final ultimatum was again left unanswered.

Despite all the martiality of the Free Corps their resistance proved to be negligible. The armed camp of Utrecht, where the Rhinegrave of Salm had personally assumed command a few months earlier, was evacuated without a fight, after Salm on 14 September convinced the Military Commission in Woerden that it was a rat trap, about to be encircled by two Prussian pincers, and that it was strategically necessary to retreat to Amsterdam. This earned the Rhinegrave the enduring opprobrium of the Patriots and all Dutch historians, but he was probably right. The retreat proved, however, a death blow to Patriot morale. Though the Patriots indeed made a stand around Amsterdam (without Salm, however, who was replaced by a French officer, Jean Baptiste Ternant). The Prussians attacked on 1 October and the city capitulated on the 10th, after the French had intimated that no assistance would be forthcoming.

Aftermath

The stadtholder returned to The Hague on 20 September 1787 at the head of the States-army troops that had marched together with the triumphant Prussian army. A purge of the States of Holland and the States General, both institutions who had their seat in The Hague, started immediately. The immediate result was that Mappa, who was in charge of the fortress town of Naarden was ordered by the reconstituted States of Holland to surrender it to the Prussians, which he did on 27 September.

Even before the return of the stadtholder the Holland  had taken the initiative to have the States repeal all legislation of the preceding years with a "Patriot" imprint. The "Orange Restoration" proceeded apace. Everywhere the Patriot members of the local  and city magistracies were purged. The Grand Pensionary of Holland Pieter van Bleiswijk (who had chosen the Patriot side in 1785) was replaced by his Zeeland colleague Laurens Pieter van de Spiegel in November 1787. On the instruction of Princess Wilhelmina and ambassador Harris he started criminal proceedings against a number of Patriot leaders on a list Wilhelmina provided, like Robert Jasper van der Capellen, two , and two Elburg ministers, who were all sentenced to death in absentia. Daendels and Ondaatje were sentenced to perpetual banishment, as were a number of other Patriot leaders. A limited Amnesty was declared in November 1787, but the "extra-judicial" persecution of Patriots was more effective anyway: in Gouda 200 houses were looted by the Orangist mob; in 's Hertogenbosch 829; in Utrecht the bill ran to one million guilders. 

More than 40,000 Patriots (including women and children) fled abroad to Antwerp and Brussels in the Austrian Netherlands, and from there to towns in French Flanders (in those days still Flemish speaking), like Saint-Omer and Dunkirk, where they were hospitably received by the French government, at the request of Van der Capellen tot den Marsch, who wrote a memorandum to King Louis asking for financial support of the refugees. The king provided funding for the financial relief, which was administered by the Frisian Patriots Court Lambertus van Beyma as Commissioner, and Johan Valckenaer, as his secretary. They represented the "aristocrat" and "democrat" wings of the Frisian Patriots, respectively, however, and soon fell out over the disbursements. This led to a schism in the Patriot community in France. The followers of Valckenaer eventually came out on top, as they won the support of the French comptroller-general , who was enraged by Beyma's venality. The two factions, "Valckenisten" and "Beymanisten" split, and formed competing clubs that became embroiled in internal French politics during the French Revolution. Valckenaer became involved in the Batavian Legion that fell afoul of the Jacobins, who distrusted foreigners. But eventually the Dutch Patriots got back in the good graces of the French government after the Thermidorian Reaction and Dutch volunteers formed part of the French army that invaded the Dutch Republic in late 1794. Daendels and Jan Willem de Winter even became .

Other Patriots eventually migrated to the United States, like Mappa, who established a type foundry in New York City, that soon went bankrupt, however. He later became the agent of the Holland Land Company, a vehicle for land speculation founded by Pieter Stadnitski and a number of Amsterdam Patriot financiers in 1789, in Barneveld, New York, where he was joined by François Adriaan van der Kemp, the distributor of Van der Capellen's pamphlet.

The Patriot Revolt, its causes and its denouement in the Prussian intervention were of great interest to the Founding Fathers. This is illustrated by Federalist Paper No. 20, written by James Madison and published under the pseudonym Publius on 11 December 1787 in the context of the debate about the United States Constitution, more particularly about the defects of the Articles of Confederation and similar constitutions. After a description and analysis of the constitution of the Dutch Republic, the paper characterizes it as an example to avoid: 
The Paper explicitly refers to the Prussian intervention, but apparently the news of its success had not yet reached the U.S. by the time of the paper's publication, as the wording leaves the hope open that the Patriots will prevail: 

In the Dutch Republic, meanwhile, Harris worked to ensure that such an outcome would not come about; that there would not be a repeat of the Patriot Revolt; and that the stadtholderian regime would remain on top in perpetuity. To that end he initiated a network of diplomatic treaties that would anchor the regime, beginning with a treaty between Great Britain and the Dutch Republic, signed on 15 April 1788 by Van de Spieghel in London. It guaranteed the stadtholderate to the House of Orange-Nassau in perpetuity and formed a defensive alliance between the two countries. On the same date, at the same hour, a similar treaty was signed between Prussia and the Republic in Berlin. To complete the triangle, Harris brought about a treaty between Great Britain and Prussia during a visit of the Prussian king to his sister at Het Loo on 12/13 June 1788, again guaranteeing the stadtholderian constitution, and renewing the Anglo-Prussian military alliance. This led to the Triple Alliance that was signed on 13 August 1788 between all three countries. Meanwhile, on 10 July 1788 the States General had passed the Act of Guarantee that became a formal part of the Constitution of the Dutch Republic. In this case "perpetuity" only lasted seven years. One of the first actions of the 
Provisional Representatives of the People of Holland during the Batavian Revolution of 1795, that founded the Batavian Republic, was its repeal and ritual burning on 16 February 1795. The stadtholder had already fled to Great Britain with his family. He would never return.

Notes and references
Notes

References

Sources
Adams, J. (1852), The Works of John Adams, Second President of the United States: With a Life of the Author, Notes and Illustrations, Volume 7 

Cobban, A. (1954) Ambassadors and secret agents: the diplomacy of the first Earl of Malmesbury at the HagueGeyl, P. (1947), De patriottenbeweging: 1780-1787 
 Israel, J.I. (1995), The Dutch Republic: Its Rise, Greatness and Fall, 1477-1806, Oxford University Press, hardback,  paperback

 (2005)), De Lage Landen 1780-1980. Twee eeuwen Nederland en België. Deel I: 1780–1914. Amsterdam/Antwerp: Olympus (part of Atlas Contact) 
Mens, S. (2013), De Patriottentijd. Waarom mislukte de Patriottische opstand? (1781-1787) (thesis)  
 Schama, S. (1977), Patriots and Liberators. Revolution in the Netherlands 1780-1813'', New York, Vintage books,

External links
 

 
1780s in the Dutch Republic
Political history of the Netherlands
Republicanism in the Netherlands
Dutch words and phrases
Patriotism